Clioperla is a genus of green-winged stoneflies in the family Perlodidae. It is monotypic, being represented by the single species, Clioperla clio.

References

Further reading

 
 

Perlodidae
Plecoptera genera
Monotypic insect genera
Articles created by Qbugbot